Paul Gnamia M'Boule (born April 11, 1938) is an Ivorian sprint canoer who competed in the late 1960s and early 1970s. He was eliminated in the semifinals of the K-2 1000 m event at the 1968 Summer Olympics in Mexico City. Four years later in Munich, M'Boule was eliminated in the repechage round of the same event.

External links
Sports-reference.com profile

1938 births
Canoeists at the 1968 Summer Olympics
Canoeists at the 1972 Summer Olympics
Ivorian male canoeists
Living people
Olympic canoeists of Ivory Coast